The Cotton Club Boys were African American chorus line entertainers who, from 1934, performed class act dance routines in musical revues produced by the Cotton Club until 1940, when the club closed, then as part of Cab Calloway's revue on tour through 1942.

They debuted in the 24th edition of the "Cotton Club Parade" in spring 1934, a period at the beginning of the swing era, the post-Harlem Renaissance, a year after Prohibition, and the trough of the Great Depression. The chorus line's name often included a prefix reflecting the number of entertainers, such as "The Six Cotton Club Boys", "The 12 Cotton Club Boys", etc.

History 

Some Cotton Club Boys alumni went on to become major influences in American arts and culture. Cholly Atkins, for example, contributed to Motown, musical theatre, and film. While the Cotton Club Boys were African-American, the Cotton Club maintained a whites-only policy for customers.

The original Cotton Club, Harlem (1923–1936) 
The Cotton Club first opened in 1923 in Harlem on the 2nd floor of a building at 142nd Street and Lenox Avenue, close to Sugar Hill. The space had been formerly leased and operated by the boxer Jack Johnson as the Club Delux, an intimate supper club. Owney Madden, a bootlegger and gangster, took over the lease in 1923 after his release from Sing Sing. He was one among the syndicate owners that included beer baron Bill Duffy, boxer Tony Panica (John Francis Panica, known in the boxing world as Tommy Wilson), and Harry Block. Madden redecorated the space and changed the name to the Cotton Club. The Cotton Club sold liquor during Prohibition, which lasted until 1933. When the club opened, George "Big Frenchy" Demange was the manager.

The Savoy Ballroom, which had a no-discrimination policy, was one block south at 596 Lenox Avenue. Smalls Paradise, which also had a no-discrimination policy, was seven blocks south and one avenue west at 2294 Seventh Avenue. The old Harlem Club at 142nd Street and Lenox Avenue reopened in May 1937 as the Plantation Club.

The new Cotton Club, Midtown (1936–1940) 
Following the repeal of Prohibition in 1933 and the Harlem riot of 1935, jazz venues began moving from Harlem to Midtown, around 52nd Street, and downtown. The new Cotton Club opened September 24, 1936, at Broadway and 48th Street, in the Great White Way section of the Theater District near Times Square. The Cotton Club was closed for the 1936 season while the owners planned the move. In the interim, some of the entertainers from the original club performed in productions billed as the "Cotton Club Revue" at the Harlem Alhambra.

Closing of the Cotton Club (1940) 
The last show at the Cotton Club ran Saturday night, May 15, 1940, just before Madden left New York. It was reported in 1940 that the Cotton Club had suffered from competition from the World's Fair. Another likely impetus for the closing were the demands of Local 802, the New York chapter of the American Federation of Musicians, for back pay, especially salaries owed to Andy Kirk's band. The location subsequently opened as a nightclub called the Latin Quarter.

Influences on the Cotton Club Boys 

John Tiller (1854–1925): pioneer of precision dancing, influenced the Cotton Club Boys and Girls, who performed can-cans

Selected productions: Cotton Club Boys with the Cotton Club Revue

Cotton Club Boys with the Cotton Club Revue

1934
 24th edition of Cotton Club Parade
 Opened March 23, 1934; opening night was largest show ever staged there; production ran for nine months, merging into fall edition
 Produced by Dan Healy (Daniel E. Healy; 1888–1969)
 Harold Arlen's last show with Cotton Club Parade
 Jimmie Lunceford and His Orchestra featuring Adelaide Hall
 Debut of Cotton Club Boys: Stretch Johnson, Charles "Chink Collins, William Smith, Walter Shepherd, Tommy Porter, Maxie Armstrong, Louis Brown, Jimmy Wright, Thomas "'Chink" Lee, Eddie Morton
 Songs introduced:  "Ill Wind" and "Primitive Prima Donna", both written by Arlen (music) and Koehler (words) for Hall in this production

 25th edition of Cotton Club Parade
 Produced by Dan Healy 
 Ran for 8 months
 Featuring: Adelaide Hall, Avon Long, and Lena Horne
 Dances by Elida Webb (Elida Webb Dawson; 1893–1975); staging by Dan Healy

1935
 26th edition of Cotton Club Parade
 Opened Thursday, July 25, 1935
 Co-stars included Nina Mae McKinney
 Claude Hopkins and His Orchestra with singer Orlando Roberson (vocalist)
 Producers: Ted Koehler, Leonard Harper, Elida Webb
 Music scoring and arranging: Will Vodery, Claude Hopkins, Alex Hill, Ted Koehler 
 Cotton Club Girls: Dolly McCormack, Lucille Wilson (married Louis Armstong in 1942), Anna Jones, Joyce Beasley, Mae Williamson, Hy Curtiss, Tony Ellis, Ione Sneed, Anna Bell Wilson, Nan Joyce, Marie Robinson, Myrtle Quinland, Arlene Payas
 Cotton Club Boys: Chink Lee, Freddie Heron, Ernest Frazier, Eddie Morton, Al Alstock, Louis Brown, Jules Adger

 At the Apollo
 November 29, 1935 - December 6, 1935
 Featuring: Claude Hopkins and His Band with Orlando Roberson (vocalist) and the New Fall Edition of the Cotton Club Revue:
 Butterbeans and Susie, Babe Matthews, Cook and Brown - tap dance duo of Charles Cook and Ernest Brown - Miller and Mantan, Jesse Cryor (de) (1906–2006), Cora LaRedd (died 1968), Bob Wallace, Lena Horne, Dolly McCormack, the Cotton Club Boys, the Cotton Club Girls

1936
 At the Apollo
 Opened June 26, 1936 (for 1 week)
 Chick Webb and His Band with Bardu Ali (vocalist and MC)
 Taft Jordan, trumpeter, was in the band
 Staging by Addison Carey (likely a pseudonym; 1899–1952)
 Cotton Club Boys
 Stars included Charles Linton, Teddy McRae, Charlie Ray, Kitty Aublanche;
 Pete, Peaches and Duke - precision dancers
 Gary Lambert "Pete" Nugent (1909–1973)
 Irving "Peaches" Beamon (born 1911)
 Duke Miller (1910–1937)
 Pigmeat-Mason-Baskette
 Dewey "Pigmeat" Markham
 John Mason
 Jimmy Baskette
 Vivian Harris (1902 - 2000)

 1st edition (aka 27th edition) of Cotton Club Parade
 Opened mid-September 1936
 At the new Cotton Club at Broadway and 48th Street
 Produced by Dan Healy
 Book, lyrics, and music by Benny Davis and J. Fred Coots
 Directed by Clarence Robinson
 Featuring Cab Calloway and His Orchestra
 Production and dances by Clarence Robinson

 At the Comedy Theater, 110 West 41st Street, Manhattan
 Black Rhythm, a "sepia swing musical comedy" in two acts
 Book, music, and lyrics by Donald Heywood (Donald Gerard Heywood; 1896–1967)
 Directed by Earl Dancer and Lionel Heywood
 Produced by Earl Dancer and J.H. Levy
 December 19, 1936 - December 24, 1936
 Principal stars included Jeni Le Gon and dancer Avon Long
 Opening performance was panned by The New York Times theater critic, Bosley Crowther
 Production included the Cotton Club Boys

1937
 2nd edition of Cotton Club Parade
 Duke Ellington and His Orchestra featuring Ethel Waters and the Nicholas Brothers

 At the Nixon Grand Theatre, Philadelphia
 April 1937
 Jimmy Lunceford and His Orchestra, Phantom Steppers, Sandy Burns, Dusty Fletcher, George Wiltshire, the Six Cotton Club Boys

 3rd edition of Cotton Club Parade (at midtown Cotton Club)
 Staged by Leonard Reed
 Duke Ellington (house band), Ethel Waters, Nicholas Brothers, George Dewey Washington (1898–1954), Bill Bailey, Renee and Estelle, Kaloah, Tip, Tap, and Toe (Samuel Green, Ted Frazier, Ray Winfield), Dynamite Hooker
 The Chocolateers (acrobatic dance team); possibly the original members: Al Bert "Gip" Gipson, Paul Black, known for his Chinese splits (straddling the floor as he walked), and Eddie West (with James Buster Brown replacing West for a short period of time)

1938
 4th edition of Cotton Club Parade

 5th edition of Cotton Club Parade

 At the Apollo
 August 26–31, 1938 
 WMCA broadcast
 Luis Russell Orchestra featuring Red Allen (without Louis) and Sonny Woods, Hazel Diaz (1908 - 1997), the Cotton Club Boys

1939
 At the Apollo
 January 7–8 (at midnight)
 Featured Jimmy Lunceford and His Band
 Stars included Lora Pierre (tap dancer), Flash and Dash, The Three Chocolateers, Jackie Mabley, Dusty Fletcher, The Cotton Club Boys and the Harperettes

 At the Broadhurst Theatre
 The Hot Mikado (non-WPA version)
 March 23, 1939, to June 3, 1939 (85 performances)
 Directed by Bill Robinson and Cab Calloway
 Score by Ted Koehler and Rube Bloom
 Koehler supervised the production
 Featured Cab Calloway and His Orchestra, alternating with Socarres's Band
 Included Sister Tharpe, Tanya, Katherine Perry, the Beachcombers, Glenn and Jenkins - comedy team of William "Willie" Henry Glenn and Walter Jenkins (Walter Jenkins Manigault; 1884 - 1953) - Ruby Hill, Myra Johnson, Son and Sonny - tap dancers Roland James and Sonny Montgomery - Will Vodery's choir, the Six Cotton Club Boys, and a full complement of fifty Harlem dancing girls

 At the World's Fair, Hall of Music
 Located at Flushing Meadows–Corona Park
 The Hot Mikado
 (video clip via YouTube)
 Opened June 20, 1939 (ran 14 months)
 Included the Cotton Club Boys

 6th edition of Cotton Club Parade
 Opened November 1, 1939

1940
 1940: The Hot Mikado
 The Six Cotton Club Boys, 14-month run with Bill Robinson, traveling with Cab Calloway and His Band

 At the Apollo
 May 23–30, 1940

 On tour

 At the State Theater, Main Street and Morgan Street, Hartford
 May 25 and 26, 1940 
 Included The Six Cotton Club Boys

 At the Apollo
 Opened June 21, 1940
 Anise and Aland and Pete Nugent along with Cotton Club Boys and Apollo Dancing Girls
 Show included The Six Cotton Club Boys: Jules Adger, Louis Brown, Freddie Heron, Chink Lee (manager), Charles Atkinson, Eddie Morton

 In Montreal
 In Wrentham
 In Norfolk
 In Raleigh
 In Knoxville

 At the Paramount Theatre

 On tour, Brendt circuit

 At the Strand Theatre, 501 South Salina Street, Syracuse, New York
 September 13, 1940

 In Flatbush, Brooklyn
 Opened around September 30, 1940 (for a week engagement)

 At the Apollo
 Cab Calloway's New Revue
 Opened Friday, November 22, 1940
 Stars included Avis Andrews, Anice and Aland, Cook and Brown, Sixteen Apollo Rockettes, and
 The Six Cotton Club Boys

1941
 At the State-Lake Theater, Chicago
 January 1941

 At the Paramount Theater, 509 Grand Avenue, Des Moines
 January 1941

 At Shea's in Buffalo
 February 1941
 Featuring Cab Calloway and His Orchestra
 Included The Six Cotton Club Boys

 At the RKO Temple Theatre, 35 Clinton Avenue S., Rochester, New York
 From February 7–13, 1941

 At the Stanley Theatre, Pittsburgh
 February 19, 1941

 At the State Theater, Main Street and Morgan Street, Hartford
 March 14, 15, 16, 1941

 At the State Theater, 212 Locust Street, Harrisburg, Pennsylvania
 March 18, 1941

 At the Earle Theatre, 11th and Market, Philadelphia

 Cab Calloway's Quizzicale
 National broadcasts of live performances
 July 6 - October 5, 1941
 Mutual Broadcasting System
 At Camp Wheeler, Macon, Georgia
 At Fort Dix, near Trenton, New Jersey

 At the State-Lake Theater, Chicago
 4th appearance in 24 months

 At the Rialto, Louisville, Kentucky
 Opened October 25, 1941

 At the Palace Theatre, Canton, Ohio

 At the State Theatre, Uniontown, Pennsylvania

 At the State Theater, Hartford

 At the Adams Theatre, 28 Branford Place, Newark

 At the Strand Theatre, Brooklyn

1942
 Cab Calloway's Quizzicale
 National broadcasts of live performances
 Blue Network ran weekly on Tuesday evenings for 6 months
 February 25, 1942; 
 From Detroit, March 4, 1942 
 From The Panther Room, Hotel Sherman, Chicago, April 21, 1942
 At the Casa Mañana nightclub, 8781 Washington Boulevard in Culver City
 Opened July 23, 1942
 Largest 4-day opening in the club's history; opening night drew 9,084 patrons

1942–44 musicians' strike
 Commenced August 1, 1942: no musician could perform on a radio broadcast or make a recording

 At the Orpheum Theatre, Minneapolis
 November 1942

 At the Paradise Theatre, Detroit
 December 4–10, 1942
 Stars included Cholly and Dotty (Dotty Saulters; 1922–1962) (dancers), Benny Payne (de) (1907–1986) (vocalist), Cotton Club Boys

Selected members 

Ten original members
 Howard Johnson (aka "Stretch Johnson", Howard Eugene Johnson; 1915 - 2000); his sister Winnie Johnson (1918 - 1980) was a member of the Cotton Club Girls, from 1937 - 1938 was married to Hollywood actor Stepin Fetchit
 Charles "Chink" Collins
 Billy Smith (William Smith) went into the restaurant business; during World War II, served in the first fully integrated outfit in the U.S. Army as an entertainer in Irving Berlin's production This Is The Army
 Walter Shepherd
 Tommy Porter (Thomas Porter)
 Maxie Armstrong (Maxwell Armstrong, Jr.; 1914 - 2001) sang with the 366th Infantry Band during World War II
 Louis Brown went on to become a liquor salesman
 Jimmy Wright
 Thomas "Chink" Lee (manager) went on to become a tavern manager
 Eddie Morton (Edward James Morton, Jr.; 1910 - 1998) in 1951 married singer Ida Mae James, then in 1960 married Nan Steinburg

Subsequent members
 Cholly Atkins (Charles Sylvan Atkinson; 1913 - 2003) began dancing with the Cotton Club Boys as a substitute from someone who was ill; Honi Coles, who lived in the same building as Atkins, made the recommendation; production was Bill Robinson's The Hot Mikado, the biggest hit of Cotton Club Revue; Atkins soon became a choreographer with Cotton Club Boys
 Jules Adjer (Julian Francis Adger, Jr.; 1913 - 1991) among other things, was a dancer in the 1943 film, Cabin in the Sky
 Freddie Heron (Frederick Clinton Heron; 1910 - 1977) born in the Panama Canal Zone; went on to become chief bartender at Shalimar by Randolph at 3638 Broadway (at 150th Street) and 2065 7th Avenue (at 123rd Street), owned by Luther "Red" Randolph (Luther Jerry Randolph; 1912 - 2005), club flourished from 1939 to 1966; in 1954 went out on his own, taking on food concession at the Silver Rail in Harlem (current location of Magic Johnson Theatres)
 Warren Coleman (1900 - 1968) brother of Ralph Coleman
 Roy Chink Baker went on to own the Mona Lisa Tavern on Lexington Avenue
 Al Martin
 Ernest Frazier
 Al Alstock (Paxton Alfonson Allstock; 1914 - 1937) died on October 18, 1937; had married Mary Leah Harris on February 12, 1937
 Roy Carter
 Sherman Coates

Notes

References 

Dance companies in New York City
American dance groups
American tap dancers
American male dancers
African-American male dancers
African-American dancers
Harlem Renaissance
African-American cultural history
1934 establishments in New York City